WaterMinder is an app that tracks user’s daily water intake while also reminding them to drink water, based on pre-set goals. It was first released in 2013 and is available on the Apple App Store for iPhones and the Google Play Store for Android devices. It requires iOS 7.0 or later on Apple devices and Android 4.0 or later for Android devices.

It is available in 15 languages and was developed by Funn Media, and independent software company and app producer.

In 2015 WaterMinder was named the best app in the best fitness category at the Silicon Beach App Awards.

An Apple Watch version of the app was released in 2015. WaterMinder was one of the first apps made available on the Apple App Store for the Apple Watch.

References

Mobile applications
Nutrition
Water